Lophocampa hispaniola is a moth of the family Erebidae. It was described by Vincent in 2009. It is found in the Dominican Republic.

References

Moths described in 2009
hispaniola
Moths of the Caribbean